Azadeh is a Persian female given name meaning free and free-minded. People named Azadeh include:

People
 Azadeh Ensha, Iranian-American journalist
 Azadeh Moaveni (born 1976), Iranian-American journalist and writer
 Azadeh Shafiq ((1951–2011), Iranian royal and journalist
 Azadeh Shahshahani, Iranian-American human rights attorney

Fictional characters
 Azadeh (Shahnameh), a character in Shahnameh of Ferdowsi

Persian feminine given names